William H. Inmon (born 1945) is an American computer scientist, recognized by many as the father of the data warehouse. Inmon wrote the first book, held the first conference (with Arnie Barnett), wrote the first column in a magazine and was the first to offer classes in data warehousing. Inmon created the accepted definition of what a data warehouse is - a subject oriented, nonvolatile, integrated, time variant collection of data in support of management's decisions. Compared with the approach of the other pioneering architect of data warehousing, Ralph Kimball, Inmon's approach is often characterized as a top-down approach.

Biography 
William H. Inmon was born July 20, 1945 in San Diego, California. He received his Bachelor of Science degree in mathematics from Yale University in 1967, and his Master of Science degree in computer science from New Mexico State University.

He worked for American Management Systems and Coopers & Lybrand before 1991, when he founded the company Prism Solutions, which he took public. In 1995 he founded Pine Cone Systems, which was renamed Ambeo later on. In 1999, he created a corporate information factory web site for his consulting business. 

Inmon coined terms such as the government information factory, as well as data warehousing 2.0.  Inmon promotes building, usage, and maintenance of data warehouses and related topics. His books include "Building the Data Warehouse" (1992, with later editions) and "DW 2.0: The Architecture for the Next Generation of Data Warehousing" (2008).

In July 2007, Inmon was named by Computerworld as one of the ten people that most influenced the first 40 years of the computer industry.

Inmon's association with data warehousing stems from the fact that he wrote the first book on data warehousing he held the first conference on data warehousing (with Arnie Barnett), he wrote the first column in a magazine on data warehousing, he has written over 1,000 articles on data warehousing in journals and newsletters, he created the first fold out wall chart for data warehousing and he conducted the first classes on data warehousing. 

In 2012, Inmon developed and made public technology known as "textual disambiguation". Textual disambiguation applies context to raw text and reformats the raw text and context into a standard data base format. Once raw text is passed through textual disambiguation, it can easily and efficiently be accessed and analyzed by standard business intelligence technology. Textual disambiguation is accomplished through the execution of TextualETL.

Bill owns and operates Forest Rim Technology, a company that applies and implements data warehousing solutions executed through textual disambiguation and TextualETL.

Awards 
(2002) DAMA International Professional Achievement Award for, "major contributions as the 'father of data warehousing' and a recognized thought leader in decision support" from DAMA International, The Global Data Management Community. 
(2018) Received a Lifetime Achievement Award from Data Modelling Zone. 
(December 2020) Received a Lifetime Achievement Award from Project Management Institute (PMI).

Publications 
Bill Inmon has published more than 60 books in nine languages and 2,000 articles on data warehousing and data management.

Inmon, William H.; Imhoff Claudia; Battas, Greg (1996) Building the Operational Data Store, Wiley,

See also 
 Single version of the truth
 The Kimball lifecycle, a high-level sequence tasks used to design, develop and deploy a data warehouse or business intelligence system

References

External links
Corporate Information Factory  - Internet Archive's copy of www.inmoncif.com, retrieved on 2016-01-16

1945 births
Data warehousing
Living people
New Mexico State University alumni
People in information technology
Yale University alumni